The Prairies and Pineywoods Wildlife Trail is a state-designated system of trails and wildlife sanctuaries in the Texas Panhandle in the United States. It is one of the four major wildlife trail systems designated by the State of Texas.

The trail system consists of two separate groups of rails. The western trails, which are more prairie terrain, cover an area stretching from Brenham and College Station in the south to Wichita Falls and Denison in the north. The eastern trails, which are more woodland terrain, cover an area stretching from Huntsville and Hemphill in the south to Paris and Texarkana in the north.

The trails include locations in Sam Houston National Forest, Davy Crockett National Forest, and Sabine National Forest.

Notes

External links
 Prairies and Pineywoods Wildlife Trails

Hiking trails in Texas
Protected areas of Texas
Protected areas of Washington County, Texas
Protected areas of Brazos County, Texas
Protected areas of Wichita County, Texas
Protected areas of Grayson County, Texas
Protected areas of Walker County, Texas
Protected areas of Sabine County, Texas
Protected areas of Lamar County, Texas
Protected areas of Bowie County, Texas